Zuckert is surname of:
 Bill Zuckert (1915–1997), American actor
 Eugene M. Zuckert (1911–2000), United States Secretary of the Air Force
 León Zuckert (1904, Poltava - 1992, Toronto), Ukrainian-Canadian composer, conductor, arranger, violinist, violist
 Catherine Zuckert (born 1942), American political philosopher 
 Michael Zuckert (born 1942), American political philosopher 
 Rachel Zuckert, American philosopher

Zückert 
 Johann Friedrich Zückert (1737, Berlin - 1778, Berlin), German physician

German-language surnames
Jewish surnames